Joshua Myers (born 1986) is a British actor, known for his role as Snake in the 2010 UK mystery-thriller film Psychosis. Myers starred in a television commercial for Three Lions and had his first lead role in the British thriller film Psychosis. Myers stars in the sequel World of the Dead: The Zombie Diaries 2, which follows the storyline of The Zombie Diaries. He portrayed a minor role, Chechen 2, in the 2011 action-thriller The Veteran.

Filmography

2010: Psychosis - Snake 
2010: My Angel
2011: World of the Dead: The Zombie Diaries 2 - Curtis
2011: The Veteran - Chechen man
2012: Screwed - Panos
2013: Green Street 3 - Big John'2014 : I Am Soldier - Chris 
2014 : White Collar Hooligan - Damien 
2015: Razors - Denton Price 
2015 : Legend - Guzzepi 
2015 : The Fall of the Krays - Frankie Fraser 
2015 : Bonded by Blood 2 - Ricky Percival 
2015 : Anti-Social - Marcus
2017 : Romans - Colin
2017 : Rise of the Footsoldier 3: The Pat Tate Story - Ken
2018 : The Krays: Dead Man Walking - Frank Mitchell
2019 : Once Upon a Time in London - Moisha Blueball
2019 : Rise of the Footsoldier 4 - Ken

References

External links
 

English male film actors
English male stage actors
Male actors from London
1986 births
Living people